The Northern Theater Command Ground Force is the ground force under the Northern Theater Command. Its headquarters is in Jinan, Shandong.

History 
The Northern Theater Command Ground Force was officially established on 31 December 2015 with the troops of former Jinan Military Region and Shenyang Military Region.

Functional department 
 General Staff
 Political Work Department
 Logistics Department
 Equipment department
 Disciplinary Inspection Committee

Direct units 
 Zhurihe Joint Tactic Training Base

Direct troops

Group army 
 78th Group Army (stations in Harbin, Heilongjiang)
 79th Group Army (stations in Shenyang, Liaoning)
 80th Group Army (stations in Weifang, Shandong)

Other army 
 Fourth Brigade of Reconnaissance Intelligence
 Fourth Brigade of Information Support
 Fourth Brigade of Electronic Warfare
 321st Brigade of Coastal Defense Force (stations in Alxa League, Inner Mongolia)
 322nd Brigade of Coastal Defense Force (stations in Baotou, Inner Mongolia)
 323rd Brigade of Coastal Defense Force (stations in Xilingol League, Inner Mongolia)
 324th Brigade of Coastal Defense Force (stations in Hulunbuir and Arxan, Inner Mongolia)
 325th Brigade of Coastal Defense Force (stations in Manzhouli, Inner Mongolia)
 326th Brigade of Coastal Defense Force (stations in Mohe and Heihe, Heilongjiang)
 327th Brigade of Coastal Defense Force (stations in Hegang, Heilongjiang)
 328th Brigade of Coastal Defense Force (stations in Jidong County, Heilongjiang)
 329th Brigade of Coastal Defense Force (stations in Hunchun, Jilin)
 330th Brigade of Coastal Defense Force (stations in Baishan, Jilin)
 331st Brigade of Coastal Defense Force (stations in Dandong, Liaoning)
 332nd Brigade of Coastal Defense Force (stations in Dalian, Liaoning)
 333rd Brigade of Coastal Defense Force (stations in Yantai, Shandong)
 334th Brigade of Coastal Defense Force (stations in Weihai, Shandong)
 335th Brigade of Coastal Defense Force (stations in Qingdao and Rizhao, Shandong)

List of leaders

Commanders

Political commissars

Chief of staffs

References 

Northern Theater Command
Shenyang Military Region
Jinan Military Region
Military units and formations established in 2015
2015 establishments in China